The Dollar Princess and Her Six Admirers is a 1927 German silent film directed by Felix Basch and starring Liane Haid, Georg Alexander, and Elisabeth Pinajeff.

The film's sets were designed by the art director Robert Neppach.

Cast
Liane Haid as Liane
Georg Alexander as Michael Rupp
Elisabeth Pinajeff as Clarissa Cleart
Sig Arno as Baron
Betty Astor as Mizzi
Hans Albers as secretary
Jaro Fürth as Revisor
Leopold von Ledebur as hotel director
Josefine Dora as cook

References

External links

Films of the Weimar Republic
Films directed by Felix Basch
German silent feature films
German black-and-white films
Films scored by Leo Fall